Generation M may refer to:

Generation M (comics), a five-issue X-Men comics spinoff
Generation Z, those who grew up during the birth and rise of the Internet